Mellow Soul is an album by organist Don Patterson recorded in 1967 and released on the Prestige label.

Reception

Allmusic awarded the album 3 stars stating "A trio date with David Fathead Newman on sax and flute plus Billy James on drums".

Track listing 
All compositions by Don Patterson except as indicated
 "Hump Snapa Blues" - 5:00    
 "Music to Think By" (Richard Boyell) - 4:00    
 "Darben the Redd Foxx" (James Moody) - 4:55    
 "Mellow Soul" - 6:40    
 "Head" (David Newman) - 6:05    
 "These Foolish Things" (Jack Strachey, Eric Maschwitz) - 9:45

Personnel 
Don Patterson - organ
David Newman - tenor saxophone, flute
Billy James - drums

References 

Don Patterson (organist) albums
1967 albums
Prestige Records albums
Albums produced by Cal Lampley
Albums recorded at Van Gelder Studio